(born 28 May 1976) is a Japanese mixed martial artist. A professional competitor since 2000, he has competed for Shooto, DEEP, and World Victory Road. He is the former Shooto Lightweight (143 lbs) Champion.

Biography
Hideki Kadowaki was born in Ichihara, Chiba Prefecture. He started MMA 11 years ago.  
He started out just goofing around with friends, and then thought it would be fun to do fighting as a job.  After deciding to become a professional fighter, he joined Wajyutsu Keisyukai in Nagasaki, where the former headquarters was located.  He worked various part-time jobs to support himself, and trained there for two years, after which he moved to Tokyo where there were more competitions and fight opportunities.
	
Currently, he trains and fights out of Wajyutsu Keisyukai Tokyo HQ, and teaches classes at Marupuro Gym once or twice a week.

His strength is in grappling, but over time he developed a good striking game, training with other Keishukai pros such as strikers Kenji Osawa, Hayate Usui, and many others. His namesake is called the Kadowaki special, which is a modified rear naked choke which is applied from the back crucifix position instead of the standard back mount.

His favorite saying is, "Just enjoy life!"

He became Shooto 65 kg champion on March 28, 2008 by defeating Akitoshi Tamura by majority decision.

Championships and accomplishments
Shooto
Shooto Lightweight Championship (One time)
2002 Shooto Lightweight Rookie Champion
2000 All Japan Amateur Shooto Welterweight Runner Up

Mixed martial arts record

|-
| Loss
| align=center| 16–17–3
| Satoshi Inaba
| Decision (majority)
| Grandslam 7: Way of the Cage
| 
| align=center| 2
| align=center| 5:00
| Tokyo, Japan
|
|-
| Loss
| align=center| 16-16-3
| Yusuke Kawango
| Decision (unanimous)
| Tribe Tokyo Fight: TTF Challenge 07
| 
| align=center| 3
| align=center| 5:00
| Tokyo, Japan
|
|-
| Win
| align=center| 16–15–3
| Yuki Ohara
| Decision (unanimous)
| DEEP: Cage Impact 2016 in Korakuen Hall
| 
| align=center| 2
| align=center| 5:00
| Tokyo, Japan
|
|-
| Win
| align=center| 15–15–3
| Satoshi Nishino
| Submission 
| Grachan 14: Mach Matsuri
| 
| align=center| 1
| align=center| 3:18
| Tokyo, Japan
|
|-
| Loss
| align=center| 14–15–3
| Kleber Koike Erbst
| Submission (rear-naked choke)
| DEEP: Cage Impact 2013
| 
| align=center| 1
| align=center| 4:21
| Tokyo, Japan
|
|-
| Loss
| align=center| 14–14–3
| Hiroshige Tanaka
| KO (punch)
| Shooto: 2nd Round 2013
| 
| align=center| 1
| align=center| 0:49
| Tokyo, Japan
|
|-
| Loss
| align=center| 14–13–3
| Tatsunao Nagakura
| TKO (punches)
| DEEP: 58 Impact
| 
| align=center| 1
| align=center| 3:35
| Tokyo, Japan
| 
|-
| Loss
| align=center| 14–12–3
| Kazunori Yokota
| Decision (unanimous)
| DEEP: 57 Impact
| 
| align=center| 3
| align=center| 5:00
| Tokyo, Japan
| For DEEP Featherweight Championship.
|-
| Draw
| align=center| 14–11–3
| Kosuke Kindaichi
| Draw
| Shooto: Gig Saitama 3
| 
| align=center| 2
| align=center| 5:00
| Saitama, Japan
| 
|-
| Win
| align=center| 14–11–2
| Yusuke Yachi
| Decision (unanimous)
| Shooto: The Rookie Tournament 2010 Final
| 
| align=center| 2
| align=center| 5:00
| Tokyo, Japan
| 
|-
| Loss
| align=center| 13–11–2
| Gustavo Falciroli
| KO (punches)
| Shooto Australia: Superfight Australia 8
| 
| align=center| 1
| align=center| 1:53
| Joondalup, Australia
| 
|-
| Loss
| align=center| 13–10–2
| Taiki Tsuchiya
| Decision (unanimous)
| Shooto: The Way of Shooto 1: Like a Tiger, Like a Dragon
| 
| align=center| 3
| align=center| 5:00
| Tokyo, Japan
| 
|-
| Loss
| align=center| 13–9–2
| Nam Phan
| TKO (punches)
| World Victory Road Presents: Sengoku 7
| 
| align=center| 1
| align=center| 3:09
| Tokyo, Japan
| 
|-
| Loss
| align=center| 13–8–2
| Takeshi Inoue
| Decision (unanimous)
| Shooto: Shooto Tradition 4
| 
| align=center| 3
| align=center| 5:00
| Tokyo, Japan
| Lost Shooto Lightweight (143 lbs) Championship.
|-
| Win
| align=center| 13–7–2
| Akitoshi Tamura
| Decision (majority)
| Shooto: Back To Our Roots 8
| 
| align=center| 3
| align=center| 5:00
| Tokyo, Japan
| Won Shooto Lightweight (143 lbs) Championship.
|-
| Win
| align=center| 12–7–2
| Rumina Sato
| Submission (rear naked choke)
| Shooto: Back to Our Roots 5
| 
| align=center| 1
| align=center| 4:09
| Tokyo, Japan
| 
|-
| Loss
| align=center| 11–7–2 
| Akiyo Nishiura
| Decision (split)
| Shooto: Back to Our Roots 2
| 
| align=center| 3
| align=center| 5:00
| Tokyo, Japan
| 
|-
| Win
| align=center| 11–6–2
| Daisuke Ishizawa
| Decision (unanimous)
| Shooto: 11/30 in Kitazawa Town Hall
| 
| align=center| 2
| align=center| 5:00
| Tokyo, Japan
| 
|-
| Win
| align=center| 10–6–2
| Adrian Pang
| Decision (unanimous)
| WR 6: Warrior's Realm
| 
| align=center| 3
| align=center| 5:00
| Australia
| 
|-
| Draw
| align=center| 9–6–2
| Miki Shida
| Draw
| GCM: D.O.G. 4
| 
| align=center| 3
| align=center| 5:00
| Tokyo, Japan
| 
|-
| Loss
| align=center| 9–6–1
| |Hatsu Hioki
| Submission (armbar)
| Shooto: Gig Central 8
| 
| align=center| 2
| align=center| 3:34
| Nagoya, Japan
| 
|-
| Win
| align=center| 9–5–1
| Akitoshi Tamura
| Decision (unanimous)
| Shooto: 3/11 in Korakuen Hall
| 
| align=center| 2
| align=center| 5:00
| Tokyo, Japan
| 
|-
| Loss
| align=center| 8–5–1
| Alexandre Franca Nogueira
| Submission (guillotine choke)
| Shooto: Year End Show 2004
| 
| align=center| 1
| align=center| 3:34
| Tokyo, Japan
| 
|-
| Loss
| align=center| 8–4–1
| Naoya Uematsu
| Submission (guillotine choke)
| Shooto: Shooto Junkie Is Back!
| 
| align=center| 1
| align=center| 0:45
| Chiba, Japan
| 
|-
| Win
| align=center| 8–3–1
| Bao Quach
| Submission (rear naked choke)
| Shooto: Year End Show 2003
| 
| align=center| 3
| align=center| 4:40
| Chiba, Japan
| 
|-
| Win
| align=center| 7–3–1
| Denisas Archirejevas
| Submission (armbar)
| Shooto: 9/5 in Korakuen Hall
| 
| align=center| 1
| align=center| 3:45
| Tokyo, Japan
| 
|-
| Win
| align=center| 6–3–1
| Makoto Ishikawa
| Decision (unanimous)
| Shooto: 5/4 in Korakuen Hall
| 
| align=center| 3
| align=center| 5:00
| Tokyo, Japan
| 
|-
| Loss
| align=center| 5–3–1
| Tetsuo Katsuta
| Decision (unanimous)
| Shooto: 3/18 in Korakuen Hall
| 
| align=center| 3
| align=center| 5:00
| Tokyo, Japan
| 
|-
| Win
| align=center| 5–2–1
| Hiroshi Komatsu
| Decision (unanimous)
| Shooto: Treasure Hunt 11
| 
| align=center| 2
| align=center| 5:00
| Tokyo, Japan
| 
|-
| Win
| align=center| 4–2–1
| Masashi Kameda
| Submission (rear naked choke)
| Shooto: Treasure Hunt 9
| 
| align=center| 1
| align=center| 2:23
| Tokyo, Japan
| 
|-
| Loss
| align=center| 3–2–1
| Eiji Murayama
| Decision (39-38)
| GCM: ORG 3rd
| 
| align=center| 2
| align=center| 5:00
| Tokyo, Japan
| 
|-
| Win
| align=center| 3–1–1
| Naoya Miyamoto
| Submission (rear naked choke)
| Shooto: Wanna Shooto 2002
| 
| align=center| 1
| align=center| 2:12
| Tokyo, Japan
| 
|-
| Loss
| align=center| 2–1–1
| Norifumi Yamamoto
| TKO (punches)
| Shooto: To The Top 8
| 
| align=center| 1
| align=center| 4:02
| Tokyo, Japan
| 
|-
| Draw
| align=center| 2–0–1
| Koji Takeuchi
| Draw
| Shooto: To The Top 2
| 
| align=center| 2
| align=center| 5:00
| Tokyo, Japan
| 
|-
| Win
| align=center| 2–0
| Takuhito Hida
| Decision (unanimous)
| Shooto: To The Top 1
| 
| align=center| 2
| align=center| 5:00
| Tokyo, Japan
| 
|-
| Win
| align=center| 1–0
| Takashi Ohuchi
| Submission (rear naked choke)
| Shooto: R.E.A.D. 12
| 
| align=center| 1
| align=center| 4:10
| Tokyo, Japan
|

References

External links
 
 Wajitsu Keishukai profile
  blog
 official Keishukai myspace site

1976 births
Living people
Japanese male mixed martial artists
Featherweight mixed martial artists
Sportspeople from Chiba Prefecture